The North China Type 19 (北支一九式拳銃) is a military sidearm produced during World War II by the Empire of Japan and China. Produced in China during the final stages of World War II, the North China Type 19 was most likely made in an effort to supply troops based in Manchuria when supply lines from Japan became disrupted by Allied submarines and bombing. Officially approved by the chief of the ordnance bureau, the Type 19 is very scarce with only eleven surviving examples known. The pistol appears to be a redesign of the Type 14 Nambu pistol but all pertinent ordinance records were lost during World War II.

Design
The Type 19 pistol is an adaptation of the Type 14 intended to simplify manufacture and improve the original design. The safety lever was relocated to the left side of the receiver behind the top of the grip panel for easier access. A takedown lever was added on the right side of the receiver forward of the trigger guard to simplify the disassembly process.

Notes

References

8×22mm Nambu firearms
Semi-automatic pistols of Japan
Firearms of the Republic of China
World War II infantry weapons of Japan
Weapons and ammunition introduced in 1944